Albert John Beacham (15 August 1902 – 14 May 1982) was an English professional footballer who made over 170 appearances in the Football League for Brentford and Gillingham as a half back.

Career statistics

References

1902 births
1982 deaths
Footballers from Birmingham, West Midlands
English footballers
Brentford F.C. players
Gillingham F.C. players
Weymouth F.C. players
Worcester City F.C. players
Evesham Town F.C. players
Association football midfielders